Some economic historians use the term merchant capitalism, a term coined by the German sociologist and economist Werner Sombart in his "The Genesis of Modern Capitalism" in 1902, to refer to the earliest phase in the development of capitalism as an economic and social system. However, others argue that mercantilism, which has flourished widely in the world without the emergence of systems like modern capitalism, is not actually capitalist as such.

Merchant capitalism is distinguished from more fully developed capitalism by its focus on simply moving goods from a market where they are cheap to a market where they are expensive (rather than influencing the mode of the production of those goods), the lack of industrialization, and of commercial finance. Merchant houses were backed by relatively small private financiers acting as intermediaries between simple commodity producers and by exchanging debt with each other. Thus, merchant capitalism preceded the capitalist mode of production as a form of capital accumulation. A process of primitive accumulation of capital, upon which commercial finance operations could be based and making application of mass wage labor and industrialization possible, was the necessary precondition for the transformation of merchant capitalism into industrial capitalism.

Early forms of merchant capitalism developed in the 9th century, during the Islamic Golden Age, while in medieval Europe from the 12th century. In Europe, merchant capitalism became a significant economic force in the 16th century. The mercantile era drew to a close around 1800, giving way to industrial capitalism.  However, merchant capitalism remained entrenched in some parts of the West well into the 19th century, notably the Southern United States, where the plantation system constrained the development of industrial capitalism (limiting markets for consumer goods) whose political manifestations prevented Northern legislators from passing broad economic packages (e.g. monetary and banking reform, a transcontinental railroad, and incentives for settlement of the American west) to integrate the states' economies and spur the growth of industrial capitalism.

See also 
 Feudalism
 Late capitalism

Notes

References 
John Day, Money and finance in the age of merchant capitalism, 1999. 
J.L. van Zanden, The rise and decline of Holland's economy: merchant capitalism and the labour market, 1993. 
Joseph Calder Miller, Way of death : merchant capitalism and the Angolan slave trade 1730–1830 1988. 
Elizabeth Genovese & Eugene D. Genovese, Fruits of merchant capital : slavery and bourgeois property in the rise and expansion of capitalism, 1983.
Paul Frentrop, A History of Corporate Governance, 1602–2002. Amsterdam: Deminor, 2003.
Andre Gunder Frank, World accumulation, 1492–1789. New York: 1978 
Henri Pirenne, Economic and social history of Medieval Europe. London: Routledge, 1936.
Michel Beaud, A history of capitalism 1500–2000. New York: Monthly Review Press, 2001.
 Nicolas Vrousalis, Capital without Wage-Labour: Marx's Modes of Subsumption Revisited', Economics and Philosophy. Vol. 34 No 3, 2018.
Immanuel Wallerstein, The Modern World System: Capitalist Agriculture and the Origins of the European World Economy in the Sixteenth Century, Academic Press, 1997. 
Immanuel Wallerstein, The Modern World System II: Mercantilism and the Consolidation of the European World-Economy, 1600–1750, Academic Press; (June 1980).
Immanuel Wallerstein, The Modern World System III: The Second Era of Great Expansion of the Capitalist World-Economy, 1730–1840s. Academic Press, 1988.

Capitalism
Medieval economics
Economy of the medieval Islamic world